Fernando Teté Quiroz is a retired Argentine football midfielder. He was born on June 19, 1968, in Buenos Aires and has worked as a football manager since 2001. He is currently the head coach of Aldosivi.

Playing career
Quiroz started his career with Buenos Aires-based Club Atlético Huracán in 1990. In 1993, he was transferred to Racing Club where he played until 1999. In 2001, he had a brief spell with Nueva Chicago.

Managerial career
Quiroz began his managerial career in 2001 with San Martín (Tucumán). He had two stints as manager of Racing Club (2002 & 2005-06). He has also worked as the manager of  Huracán, Platense, Instituto, San Martín (SJ) and Unión de Santa Fe. In addition, Quiroz managed a couple of clubs in the Liga de Fútbol Profesional Boliviano with short spells at Blooming during 2011 and Guabirá in 2013.

He was the manager for Aldosivi between 2011 and 2013 (in Primera B Nacional), and again between 2014 and 2016 (in Primera B Nacional and Argentine Primera División). He left his second spell with Aldosivi on 1 November 2016.

References

External links
 Managerial stats in the Argentine Primera at Fútbol XXI 

1968 births
Living people
Footballers from Buenos Aires
Argentine footballers
Association football midfielders
Club Atlético Huracán footballers
Racing Club de Avellaneda footballers
Nueva Chicago footballers
Argentine Primera División players
Argentine football managers
San Martín de Tucumán managers
Racing Club de Avellaneda managers
Club Atlético Huracán managers
Club Atlético Platense managers
Instituto managers
San Martín de San Juan managers
Unión de Santa Fe managers
Independiente Rivadavia managers
Club Blooming managers
Aldosivi managers
Club Atlético Sarmiento managers
Argentine expatriate football managers
Expatriate football managers in Chile
Expatriate football managers in Bolivia
Club Deportivo Guabirá managers